Aleksandr Viktorovich Troynin (born 16 March 1972) is a former Russian professional footballer.

Club career
He made his professional debut in the Soviet Top League in 1990 for FC Rotor Volgograd. He played 1 game in the UEFA Cup 1994–95 for FC Rotor Volgograd.

Honours
 Russian Cup finalist: 1995.

References

1972 births
Sportspeople from Volgograd
Living people
Soviet footballers
Russian footballers
Russian Premier League players
FC Rotor Volgograd players
FC Energiya Volzhsky players
FC Lokomotiv Nizhny Novgorod players
FC Tyumen players
FC Olimpia Volgograd players
FC Tekstilshchik Kamyshin players
FC Metallurg Lipetsk players
FC Kristall Smolensk players
Association football midfielders
Association football defenders
FC KAMAZ Naberezhnye Chelny players
Russian football managers